Charged multivesicular body protein 2b is a protein that in humans is encoded by the CHMP2B gene. It forms part of one of the endosomal sorting complexes required for transport (ESCRT) - specifically ESCRT-III - which are a series of complexes involved in cell membrane remodelling. CHMP2B forms long chains that spiral around the neck of a budding vesicle. Along with the other components of ESCRT-III, CHMP2B constricts the neck of the vesicle just before it is cleaved away from the membrane.

Mutations of this gene cause chromosome 3-linked frontotemporal dementia (FTD3), which has been described in several members of one Danish family . In a study of French families with several forms of frontotemporal dementia, it was found to be a relatively rare cause.

References

External links
 GeneReviews/NCBI/NIH/UW entry on CHMP2B-Related Frontotemporal Dementia

Further reading